Yousef Munayyer is a Palestinian-American writer and political analyst based in Washington, D.C., United States. He was the executive director of the US Campaign for Palestinian Rights. Previously he directed The Jerusalem Fund for Education and Community Development and its educational program, the Palestine Center and was also a policy analyst with the American-Arab Anti-Discrimination Committee.

Early life and education
Munayyer was born in the town of Lod, Israel, and spent the majority of his early life in New Jersey. Munayyer holds a Ph.D in Government and Politics from the University of Maryland. He also holds a BA in Political Science and History from the University of Massachusetts Amherst, and a MA in Government and Politics from the University of Maryland. His academic research interests include political repression and the intersection of foreign policy and civil liberties.

Career

Munayyer has been a leading advocate for Palestinian rights and is widely published on issues relating to Palestine, Israel, the broader Middle East as well as the civil liberties of Arab and Muslim Americans.
His writings have appeared in every major metropolitan newspaper in the United States and in edited volumes, and he has appeared on numerous national and international television and radio programs to discuss the Middle East and Palestine. He has spoken on a number of policy panels and is often invited to speak on the Middle East and Israel/Palestine at Universities and Colleges.

In 2015, he appeared on a list of the "100 Most Powerful Arabs Under 40" at number 16.

He is fluent in Arabic and English.

Fox News Interview
In July 2014, during the 2014 war between Israel and Hamas, Munayyer was asked during a Fox News segment by host Sean Hannity whether he regarded Hamas as a terrorist organization. When Munayyer equivocated, the two men got into a heated argument, with Hannity asking Munayyer what he couldn't "get through [his] thick head".

Personal life
He is married to a Palestinian from Nablus in the occupied West Bank. They met in Massachusetts when they attended neighboring colleges. They live just outside Washington.

References

External links

Living people
University of Massachusetts Amherst alumni
Mount Holyoke College alumni
Year of birth missing (living people)
Israeli emigrants to the United States
People from Washington, D.C.
Israeli political scientists
American political scientists
Palestinian political scientists